Gulf of Patience is a large body of water off the southeastern coast of Sakhalin, Russia.

Geography

The Gulf of Patience is located in the southern Sea of Okhotsk, between the main body of Sakhalin Island in the west and Cape Patience in the east. The Poronay River flows into the bay from the north. The Tyuleny Island lies off the eastern side of the bay to the south of Cape Patience.

History
The first Europeans visited the bay in 1643. They were the crew of the Dutch ship Castricum, captained by Maarten Gerritsz Vries.They named the gulf in memory of their having to wait for the fog to clear in order for them to continue with their expedition.

See also
Poronaysk

References

Patience
Bodies of water of Sakhalin Oblast
Patience
Bays of the Sea of Okhotsk